Events during the year 2016 in Ireland.

Incumbents

 President: Michael D. Higgins
 Taoiseach: Enda Kenny (FG)
 Tánaiste: 
 Joan Burton (Lab) (until 6 May 2016)
 Frances Fitzgerald (FG) (from 6 May 2016)
 Minister for Finance: Michael Noonan (FG)
 Chief Justice: Susan Denham
 Dáil: 
 31st (until 3 February 2016)
 32nd (from 10 March 2016)
 Seanad:
 24th (until 9 February 2016)
 25th (from 8 June 2016)

Events

January

 Memorials and events marking the Centenary of the Easter Rising takes place nationwide throughout the year.
 Flooding takes place across the country causing widespread damage.

February

 3 February – Taoiseach Enda Kenny dissolves the 31st Dáil and announces 26 February as the date of a general election.
 5 February – One man is killed and two other people are wounded during a shooting at the Regency Hotel in Dublin.
 8 February – Another man is shot dead in a gangland shooting in Dublin.
 26 February – The 2016 general election takes place.

March

 Talks on government formation begin.
 10 March – The 32nd Dáil meets for the first time but fails to elect a Taoiseach.
 20 March – Five members of the same family from Derry die after their car slips off the pier at Buncrana into Lough Swilly.
 27 March (Easter Sunday) – The Easter Rising centenary parade takes place in Dublin city to commemorate the start of the Easter Rising.

April

 Talks on government formation continue.
 6 April – The 32nd Dáil again fails to elect a Taoiseach.
 14 April – The 32nd Dáil fails for the third time to elect a Taoiseach. On the same day, an innocent man is shot dead in Dublin.

May

 Talks on government formation continue.
 6 May – The 32nd Dáil at last elects a Taoiseach. The new cabinet is announced.
 9 May – A gathering of naturists on Curracloe Strand is criticised by Mayor of Wexford Ger Carthy. No other complains are made. A spokesperson for the Irish Naturist Association (INA) states no one had asked the men and women, some carrying backpacks containing their picnics, to leave.
 20 May – Brendan Howlin was elected unopposed as leader of the Labour Party, succeeding Joan Burton.

June
 13 June – Ireland enter Euro 2016.

September
2 September – the body of Philip Finnegan, missing since 10 August, is found in Rahin Wood, County Kildare.

Sports

Association football

 UEFA Euro 2016

Gaelic games
2016 All-Ireland Senior Hurling Championship Final
 4 September – Kilkenny 2–20 – 2-29 Tipperary

2016 All-Ireland Senior Football Championship Final
 1 October – Dublin 1-15 – 1-14 Mayo (Replay)

Horse racing
 18 March – Don Cossack, trained by Gordon Elliott in County Meath, wins the 2016 Cheltenham Gold Cup, Europe's most prestigious steeplechase.

Rugby union
 Ireland finish third, behind England and Wales, in the 2016 Six Nations Championship.
 5 November – Ireland defeated the New Zealand All Blacks for the first time in 111 years on 5 November 2016 in Chicago on a scoreline of 40–29.

Summer Olympics: Rio de Janeiro

Qualification
 21 February – Oliver Dingley qualifies for the 2016 Summer Olympics, the first Irish diver to do so since 1948 (68 years).
 17 April – Ellis O'Reilly becomes the first female gymnast to qualify for an Olympics representing Ireland.
 22 June – golfer Rory McIlroy announces his withdrawal from the Olympics.
 23 June – golfer Graeme McDowell announces his withdrawal from the Olympics, citing the expected birth of his second child.
 28 June – golfer Shane Lowry announces his withdrawal from the Olympics.

Event
 4 August – the Irish Examiner reports that an Irish male boxer tested positive for a banned substance on the eve of the Olympics. He is later named as Michael O'Reilly. O'Reilly becomes the first athlete to test positive for drugs at the 2016 Olympics.
 5 August – on the day of the 2016 Summer Olympics opening ceremony, police in Rio de Janeiro arrest two people for attempted illegal resale of hundreds of tickets allocated to the Olympic Council of Ireland (OCI).
 7 August – Michael O'Reilly's legal team announces it is to officially appeal the boxer's proposed suspension following a failed drug test.
 8 August – boxing captain Paddy Barnes, who medalled at the previous two Olympics, loses his opening bout to a Spaniard in a shock result.
 9 August – boxer Michael O'Reilly is ruled out of the Olympics after announcing he is no longer contesting his proposed suspension and admitting to taking a supplement that may have contained a banned substance.
 14 August – Minister for Transport, Tourism and Sport Shane Ross flies to Rio de Janeiro to meet with OCI president Pat Hickey in a bid to have Hickey permit an independent member be included on the OCI's own inquiry into the ticketing fiasco.
 15 August – defending lightweight champion Katie Taylor loses her Olympic crown to a Finn in her opening bout.
 16 August – boxer Michael Conlan, a favourite for the gold medal, loses his opening bout to a Russian in contentious circumstances.
 17 August – OCI president Pat Hickey is arrested naked in a hotel room in Rio de Janeiro and charged with three crimes.
 18 August – the now former OCI president Pat Hickey is photographed being wheeled to prison from a hospital in his pyjamas. As well as resigning as OCI president, Hickey also resigns his membership of the International Olympic Committee, his role as president of the European Olympic Committees and his role as vice-president of the Association of National Olympic Committees. Meanwhile, Shane Ross returns to Dublin.
 21 August – the 2016 Summer Olympics concludes, as more IOC officials are sought by Brazilian police and the organisation's former president remains locked up in a Rio de Janeiro jail.

Arts and literature
 May – Mike McCormack's novel Solar Bones is published by Tramp Press of Dublin; it wins this year's Goldsmiths Prize.
 20 October – Sebastian Barry's novel Days Without End is published; it wins this year's Costa Book Awards in the novel and overall categories.
 3 November – Cecelia Ahern's novel Lyrebird is published.
 John Boyne's novel The Heart's Invisible Furies is published.

Deaths

January to July

 3 January – Amby Fogarty, 82, footballer (Sunderland, Hartlepool United, Cork Celtic and Cork Hibernians).
 5 January – Gerry O'Malley, 87, Gaelic footballer and hurler (Roscommon).
 6 January – Christy O'Connor Jnr, 67, golfer.
 7 January – Patrick Connolly, 88, Attorney General.
 8 January – Paddy Reid, 91, rugby union player.
 15 January – P. J. Mara, 73, public affairs consultant and senator, long illness.
 16 January – Molly Madden, 109, Ireland's oldest person.
 17 January – Billy Quinn, 80, hurler (Tipperary).
 19 January – John Corcoran, 56, Gaelic games administrator, heart attack.
 23 January – Micheál McGeary, 68, Gaelic games journalist.
 25 January – The O'Donovan, 84, hereditary chief of the O'Donovan family.
 30 January – Peter Quinn, 90, Gaelic footballer (Mayo).
 31 January – Terry Wogan, 77, broadcaster, cancer.
 2 February 
Fergus O'Farrell, 48, singer.
John V. Halloran, 85, RTÉ News editor.
 3 February – Mark Farren, 33, footballer (Derry City F.C.), cancer.
 7 February – Peter Turley, 33, Gaelic footballer (Down).
 15 February – Paul Bannon, 59, footballer (Cork City F.C.).
 17 February – George Redmond, 92, Dublin county planning manager, short illness.
 18 February – Jimmy Donnelly, 87, footballer (Belfast Celtic F.C.).
 19 February – Din Joe Crowley, 70, Gaelic footballer (Kerry).
 23 February – Johnny Murphy, 72, actor, respiratory failure.
 26 February – Henry Comerford, 79, actor and solicitor.
 28 February 
Frank Kelly, 77, actor, heart attack.
Peter Keogh, 86, Gaelic games journalist.
 7 March – Adrian Hardiman, 64, Supreme Court judge.
 10 March 
Jim McNamara, 76, athlete.
Larry Wren, 93, Commissioner of the Garda Síochána.
 14 March – Davy Walsh, 92, Irish international footballer.
 15 March 
Robert Carrickford, 88, actor.
Dick Burke, 83, politician, TD (1969-1977 & 1981–1982), Minister for Education (1973-1976) and European Commissioner (1977-1980 & 1982–1984).
 16 March – Brian Smyth, 91, Gaelic footballer (Meath).
 19 March – Paddy Philpott, 79, hurler (Cork).
 22 March – Eugene Treanor, Gaelic footballer (Down).
 24 March – Brendan Sloan, 67, Gaelic footballer (Down).
 26 March – Paddy O'Brien, 91, Gaelic footballer (Meath).
 31 March – Ben Garrett, 21, soldier.
 3 April – Seán O'Shea, 88, public relations guru.
 10 April – Michael John Shinnick, 62, Chief Scout of Scouting Ireland.
 18 April – Sir John Leslie, 4th Baronet, 99, British Army officer, aristocrat and media personality.
 20 April – James Downey, 82, Irish Independent and Irish Times journalist.
 2 May – Basil Blackshaw, 84, artist.
 10 May – Jack Boothman, 80, President of the GAA.
 14 May – Christy O'Connor Snr, 91, professional golfer.
 16 May – Joey Maher, 82, world handball champion.
 17 May – Seán Ardagh, 68, politician, TD (1997-2011), cancer.
 20 May – Joe McDonagh, 62, Galway hurler and President of the GAA, short illness.
 4 June – Michael Keane, 69, journalist and newspaper editor, heart condition.
 10 June 
John Horgan, 66, hurler (Cork), long illness.
Ambrose Hickey, 71, Gaelic footballer (Offaly), short illness.
 13 June – Tony Byrne, 70, Irish international footballer.
 25 June – Séamus Power, 86, hurler (Waterford).
 28 June – Freddie Gilroy, 80, Olympic bronze medal winner.

July to December

 4 July – Séamus Mac Géidigh, 54, Raidió na Gaeltachta manager and journalist.
 5 July 
Mick Finucane, 93, Gaelic footballer (Kerry), short illness.
Phonsie O'Brien, 86, jockey and racehorse trainer.
 8 July – Mícheál Ó Nualláin, 88, artist, illustrator and designer.
 20 July – Mary Canavan, 108, Ireland's oldest person, natural causes.
 24 July – Finbarr Flood, 77, chairman of the Labour Court.
 26 July 
John Thomas McNamara, 41, jockey, complications following a broken neck.
Jerry Molyneaux, 60, hurling coach and Gaelic games administrator.
 30 July – Paddy Lalor, 90, TD (1961-1981), Minister for Posts and Telegraphs (1969-1970), Minister for Industry and Commerce (1970-1973), Government Chief Whip (1977-1979), MEP (1979-1994).
 4 August – Michael Walsh, 50, handball player regarded as the greatest of all time, short illness.
 8 August – Edward Daly, 82, Roman Catholic priest and author.
 9 August – Pádraig Duggan, 67, musician, recurring illness.
 10 August – John Bennett, 82, hurler (Cork).
 13 August – Liam Tuohy, 83, footballer (Shamrock Rovers) and manager.
 20 August – Louis Stewart, 72, jazz guitarist.
 22 August – Milo Corcoran, 65, president of the Football Association of Ireland, short illness.
 24 August – Larry Higgins, 87, Gaelic footballer (Derry).
 26 August – Peter Barry, 88, Fine Gael politician, short illness.
 29 August – Anne O'Brien, 60, former footballer and coach, short illness.
 3 September – Adrienne Rock Boucher, 51, model and former Miss Ireland.
 9 September – Ailish Sheehan, 23, rower, accident.
 15 September – Greg Maher, 49, former Gaelic footballer (Mayo), long illness.
 25 September – Bertie O'Hanlon, 91, former rugby union player.
 28 September – Seamus Dunne, 86, former Irish international footballer.
 2 October – Bobby Molloy, 80, former Fianna Fáil and Progressive Democrats TD.
 13 October – Martin Naughton, 62, disability rights campaigner.
 16 October 
Anthony Foley, 42, head coach of Munster Rugby.
Mickey Byrne, 93, former hurler (Tipperary).
 18 October 
 Paddy Beisty, 90, former Gaelic footballer (Roscommon).
 Francis Flood, 86, horse trainer.
 20 October 
Fergus O'Brien, 86, former Fine Gael politician.
Pat Flynn, former hurler (Waterford), heart attack.
 21 October – Moscow Flyer, 22, National Hunt horse, colic.
 29 October – Gerry O'Reilly, former Gaelic footballer (Wicklow).
 4 November – Khalid Kelly, 48/49, Irish Muslim convert and at one time the leader of Al-Muhajiroun in Ireland.
 12 November – Joe McCarthy, 43, former Gaelic footballer (Cavan).
 15 November 
Owen Gribbin, 90, former Gaelic footballer (Derry).
Ray Brady, 79, former Irish international footballer.
 20 November – William Trevor, 88, author.
 23 November – Joe Lennon, 81, former Gaelic footballer (Down).
 24 November – Jim Connors, former hurler (Wicklow).
 3 December – Willie Casey, 84, former Gaelic footballer (Mayo), short illness.
 7 December – Mick Roche, 73, former hurler (Tipperary).
 10 December – John Montague, 87, poet, complications following surgery.
 14 December – Gillian Bowler, 64, businesswoman, illness.
 28 December 
 Anthony Cronin, 88, poet and arts activist.
 Michel Déon, 97, French novelist who lived and died in Galway
 29 December – Aodán Mac Póilin, 68, Irish language activist, short illness.

See also
2016 in Irish television

References

 
2010s in Ireland
Years of the 21st century in Ireland